Nestoritherium is an extinct genus of chalicothere; it has been dated to have lived from the late Miocene to the Early Pleistocene (11.6–0.781 mya). This range makes Nestoritherium one of the most recently dated chalicotheres. It has been found in fossil sites in Myanmar and China.

The genus Nestoritherium was erected by German paleontologist Johann Jakob Kaup in 1859 for the species then known as Chalicotherium sivalense, itself named in 1843 by Falconer and Cautley from early Pleistocene material from India. The shortened faced and brachyodont dentition suggest it belongs to the subfamily Chalicotheriinae.

Nestoritherium fuguense was named from partial lower jaw and palate material from Miocene beds in Fugu County, China in 2014.

Material consisting of a fragmentary upper and lower molar recovered from the (early Pleistocene) Irrawaddy Formation in Myanmar has been referred to the genus Nestoritherium. A femur of possible chalicothere origin was recovered from Pliocene deposits in Yenangyaung in 1897.

References

Chalicotheres
Miocene mammals of Asia
Pliocene mammals of Asia
Pleistocene mammals of Asia